Dmitriy Yesipchuk (born November 17, 1974, in Chelyabinsk) is a race walker from Russia. He set the world's best-of-the-year performance in the men's 20-km walk in 2001, clocking 1:18:05 in Adler, Russia.

International competitions

References

2001 Year Ranking

1974 births
Living people
Sportspeople from Chelyabinsk
Russian male racewalkers
World Athletics Championships athletes for Russia
Russian Athletics Championships winners